Case or CASE may refer to:

Containers
 Case (goods), a package of related merchandise
 Cartridge case or casing, a firearm cartridge component
 Bookcase, a piece of furniture used to store books
 Briefcase or attaché case, a narrow box to carry paperwork
 Computer case, the enclosure for a PC's main components
 Keep case, DVD or CD packaging
 Pencil case
 Phone case, protective or vanity accessory for mobile phones
 Battery case
 Road case or flight case, for fragile equipment in transit
 Shipping container or packing case
 Suitcase, a large luggage box
 Type case, a compartmentalized wooden box for letterpress typesetting

Places
 Case, Laclede County, Missouri
 Case, Warren County, Missouri
 Case River, a Kabika tributary in Ontario, Canada
 Case Township, Michigan
 Case del Conte, Italy

People
 Case (name), people with the surname (or given name)
 Case (singer), American R&B singer-songwriter and producer (Case Woodard)

Arts, entertainment, and media
 The Case (2007), a Chinese film
 Case (album), a 1996 album by American R&B singer and songwriter Case
 "Case" (song), a 2018 song by Nigerian singer Teni
 Réttur, an Icelandic drama series
 CASE, a fictional robot in Interstellar (film)

Business, finance, and law
 CASE 30, an index of the Cairo & Alexandria Stock Exchange in Egypt
 Case Corporation, defunct manufacturer of agricultural equipment, tractors and cars
 Case Construction Equipment (Case CE), a manufacturer of construction equipment
 Case IH, a manufacturer of agricultural equipment
 W. R. Case & Sons Cutlery Co., an American manufacturer of knives
 Business case, capturing the reasoning for initiating a project
 Legal case, a dispute between opposing parties, being resolved by a court proceeding

Education
 Case (policy debate), in debate competition
 Case study, a research method involving an up-close, in-depth, and detailed examination of a particular case, in the social and life sciences
 Case Middle School, part of Punahou School in Oahu, Hawaii
 Case Western Reserve University, an independent research university in Cleveland, Ohio, US
 Center for Advanced Studies in Engineering, now Sir Syed CASE Institute of Technology, a private engineering institute in Islamabad, Pakistan
 Center for Architecture, Science and Ecology, a research facility of the Rensselaer Polytechnic Institute, US
 Centre for Christian Apologetics, Scholarship and Education, a ministry of New College, University of New South Wales
 Council for Advancement and Support of Education, a nonprofit association of educational institutions, US

Language and linguistics
 Conceptually Accurate Signed English, a sign-language variety of Manually Coded English
 Grammatical case, a common form of morphosyntactic inflection
 Letter case, a typographical distinction between capital and small letter forms

Science, technology, and mathematics

Computing
 CASE, a database used by the British Citizens Advice charity
 Best, worst and average case, in computer science, types of case analysis
 Computer-aided software engineering, for the software development life cycle
 Computer-assisted structure elucidation, for molecular geometry
 Support case (or ticket), in an issue tracking system
 Switch statement, a control statement, in programming
 Use case, a description of a system's behaviour in response to requests

Other science, technology and mathematics
 Calcium selenide (chemical formula: CaSe)
 Case-hardening, a process of hardening the surface of a metal object
 Case-shot, a type of anti-personnel canister ammunition similar to a shrapnel shell
 Case study, a research method involving in-depth examination of an individual
 Proof by cases (or exhaustion), in mathematics
 Contribution to ARIEL Spectroscopy of Exoplanets (CASE), an instrument onboard European space telescope ARIEL
 Individual case of a disease

See also
 Box
 Carton
 Casa (disambiguation)
 Casement window, a window that is attached to its frame by one or more hinges
 Casing (disambiguation)
 Crate
 Justice Case (disambiguation)